Churchill or Churchill by Spetchley is a village and civil parish  from Worcester, in the Wychavon district, in the county of Worcestershire, England. In 2001 it has a population of 24. The parish touches Bredicot, Broughton Hackett, Spetchley, Upton Snodsbury and White Ladies Aston.

Features 
There are 8 listed buildings in Churchill. Churchill has a church called St Michael's Church.

History 
The name "Churchill" means 'Crug hill'. Churchill was recorded in the Domesday Book as Circehille. Churchill was "Circehille", in the 11th century and "Cherchull", "Chirchehull" and "Cershull-juxta-Humelbrok" in the 13th century.

References 

 

Villages in Worcestershire
Civil parishes in Worcestershire
Wychavon